The 2012 Oklahoma State Cowboys football team represented Oklahoma State University in the 2012 NCAA Division I FBS football season. The Cowboys were led by eighth-year head coach Mike Gundy and played their home games at Boone Pickens Stadium in Stillwater, Oklahoma. They were a member of the Big 12 Conference. They finished the season 8–5, 5–4 in Big 12 play to finish in a tie for third place. They were invited to the Heart of Dallas Bowl where they defeated Purdue.

Personnel

Coaching staff

Schedule

Rankings

Season summary

West Virginia

    
    
    
    
    
    
    
    
    
    
    
    
    
    
    

Clint Chelf, the third quarterback to start for Oklahoma State in 2012, threw for 292 yards and four touchdowns, and Josh Stewart had a career-high 172 yards receiving as the Cowboys handed West Virginia its fourth straight defeat, 55–34.

Texas Tech

    
    
    
    
    
    
    
    
    
    
    
    

Isaiah Anderson 4 Rec, 174 Yds

References

Oklahoma State
Oklahoma State Cowboys football seasons
First Responder Bowl champion seasons
Oklahoma State Cowboys football